Jerald Grant Sisemore (born July 16, 1951) is a former American football offensive lineman who played for 12 seasons in the National Football League (NFL) for the Philadelphia Eagles from 1973 to 1984. He played college football for the University of Texas.

College career
As a sophomore, Sisemore was a regular on the 1970 Longhorn team that built an unbeaten streak to 30 games. The next year Sisemore blossomed into one of the nation's best linemen as he had the first of two consecutive seasons (1971 and 1972) where he was both an all-conference and Unanimous All-America selection. In his 1972 senior year, Texas won its third consecutive Southwest Conference title and gained its third straight Cotton Bowl Classic bid. He was inducted to the College Football Hall of Fame in 2002.

Professional career
Sisemore was an impact player with the Philadelphia Eagles, especially after the arrival of legendary coach Dick Vermeil in 1976. The Eagles gradually improved under Vermeil, and reached the NFL playoffs in 1978 and 1979, and Super Bowl XV in 1980. Sisemore was a big part of an offense that featured Philadelphia sports legends such as quarterback Ron Jaworski and running back Wilbert Montgomery. Sisemore is considered one of the greatest offensive linemen in franchise history.

See also
 List of Texas Longhorns football All-Americans

References

1951 births
Living people
American football offensive guards
American football offensive tackles
Philadelphia Eagles players
Texas Longhorns football players
All-American college football players
College Football Hall of Fame inductees
National Conference Pro Bowl players
Plainview High School (Texas) alumni
People from Lamb County, Texas
People from Plainview, Texas
Players of American football from Texas